Eurreal Wilford "Little Brother" Montgomery (April 18, 1906 – September 6, 1985) was an American jazz, boogie-woogie and blues pianist and singer.

Largely self-taught, Montgomery was an important blues pianist with an original style. He was also versatile, working in jazz bands, including larger ensembles that used written arrangements. He did not read music but learned band routines by ear.

Career
Montgomery was born in Kentwood, Louisiana, United States, a sawmill town near the Mississippi border, across Lake Pontchartrain from New Orleans, where he spent much of his childhood. Both his parents were of African-American and Creek Indian ancestry. As a child he looked like his father, Harper Montgomery, and was called Little Brother Harper. The name evolved into Little Brother Montgomery, and the nickname stuck. He started playing piano at the age of four, and by age 11 he left home for four years and played at barrelhouses in Louisiana. His main musical influence was Jelly Roll Morton, who used to visit the Montgomery household.

Early in his career he performed at African-American lumber and turpentine camps in Louisiana, Arkansas, and Mississippi. He then played with the bands of Clarence Desdunes and Buddy Petit. He lived in Chicago from 1928 to 1931, regularly playing at rent parties, and Chicago was where he made his first recordings. From 1931 through 1938, he led a jazz ensemble, the Southland Troubadours, in Jackson, Mississippi.

In 1941, Montgomery moved back to Chicago, which would be his home for the rest of his life, and went on tours to other cities in the United States and Europe. He toured briefly with Otis Rush in 1956. In the late 1950s he was discovered by a wider white audience. His fame grew in the 1960s, and he continued to make many recordings, some of them on his own record label, FM Records, which he formed in 1969 (FM stood for Floberg Montgomery, Floberg being the maiden name of his wife).

Montgomery toured Europe several times in the 1960s and recorded some of his albums there. He appeared at many blues and folk festivals during the following decade and was considered a living legend, a link to the early days of blues in New Orleans.

Among his original compositions are "Shreveport Farewell", "Farrish Street Jive", and "Vicksburg Blues". His instrumental "Crescent City Blues" served as the basis for a song of the same name by Gordon Jenkins, which in turn was adapted by Johnny Cash as "Folsom Prison Blues."

In 1968, Montgomery contributed to two albums by Spanky and Our Gang, Like to Get to Know You and Anything You Choose b/w Without Rhyme or Reason.

Montgomery died on September 6, 1985, in Champaign, Illinois, and was interred in the Oak Woods Cemetery.

In 2013, Montgomery was posthumously inducted into the Blues Hall of Fame.

The R&B musician and producer Paul Gayten was Montgomery's nephew.

Discography

See also
Adelphi Records
List of blues musicians
List of Chicago blues musicians
List of people from Louisiana
77 Records

Further reading
Deep South Piano. The Story of Little Brother Montgomery, by Karl Gert zur Heide (London: Studio Vista, 1970), provides an overview of his life and early career.
The October 1985 issue of The Mississippi Rag contains an article on Montgomery by Paige Van Vorst. The article was revised and updated and included in the liner notes of the 1990 album At Home (posthumously issued as Earwig 4918). These articles provide an overview of his life and musical career.
The two-LP set Crescent City Blues (AXM2-5522), released by RCA in 1975, which includes many of his recordings for Bluebird Records in the mid-1930s, has comprehensive liner notes by Jim O'Neal, the editor of Living Blues magazine, giving an overview of Montgomery's music career.
Conversation with the Blues, by Paul Oliver, first published in 1965 and reissued by Cambridge University Press in 1997, includes interviews with Montgomery.

References

External links
 Montgomery Discography at Folkways Records

1906 births
1985 deaths
People from Kentwood, Louisiana
African-American pianists
American blues singers
American blues pianists
American male pianists
American jazz singers
American jazz pianists
Jazz musicians from New Orleans
Paramount Records artists
Riverside Records artists
Delmark Records artists
20th-century American pianists
Singers from Louisiana
American male jazz musicians
Earwig Music artists
Folkways Records artists
Warner Music Sweden artists
20th-century African-American male singers